Good Masters! Sweet Ladies! Voices from a Medieval Village is a 2007 children's book written by Laura Amy Schlitz. The book was awarded the 2008 Newbery Medal for excellence in children's literature.

Overview 

Instead of the typical narrative structure, the book is constructed of a series of monologues, each spoken by a young member of a medieval village. Each character has a monologue with the exceptions of Petronella and Jacob, and Mariot and Maud, who have dialogues. The book was originally written to be performed by fifth-grade students at the Park School of Baltimore, where Schlitz is a librarian. It contains nineteen monologues and two dialogues, with the characters ranging from a runaway boy to the lord's daughter.

Monologues/Dialogues (in order of appearance) 
 Hugo, the Lord's nephew
 Taggot, the blacksmith's daughter
 Will, the plowboy
 Alice, the shepherdess
 Thomas, the doctor's son
 Constance, the pilgrim
 Mogg, the villein's daughter
 Otho, the miller's son
 Jack, the half-wit
 Simon, the knight's son
 Edgar, the falconer's son
 Isobel, the Lord's daughter
 Barbary, the mud slinger
 Jacob Ben Salomon, the moneylender's son and Petronella, the merchant's daughter
 Lowdy, the varlet's child
 Pask, the runaway
 Piers, the glassblower's apprentice
 Mariot and Maud, the glassblower's daughters
 Nelly, the sniggler
 Drogo, the tanner's apprentice
 Giles, the beggar

Critical reception 

According to Kirkus Reviews, "Schlitz takes the breath away with unabashed excellence in every direction." Deirdre F. Baker wrote in The Horn Book Magazine, "Byrd's pristine, elegant pen-and-ink illustrations in opulent colors make the book almost too visually appealing, belying the realistically dirty, stinky conditions described in the text." John Schwartz, in The New York Times, called Schlitz a "talented storyteller" and praised the book for its frank depiction of the Middle Ages. Nina Lindsay, chair of the Newbery Medal committee, called the monologues "superb" and stated that as a whole, they "create a pageant that transports readers to a different time and place."

In 2008, Anita Silvey, author of 100 Best Books for Children, described Good Masters! Sweet Ladies! in a School Library Journal article as one of several recent Newbery winners considered "particularly disappointing" by public librarians. Silvey "criticized the Newbery selections as too difficult for most children." Writing for Slate, Erica S. Perl responded to this criticism, saying that while her younger self might not have enjoyed the subject matter or archaic language, her "inner drama geek" would have enjoyed the theatrical elements.

References 

2007 children's books
American children's books
American historical fiction
Candlewick Press books
Children's fiction books
England in fiction
Monologues
Newbery Medal–winning works
Fiction set in the 1250s